The 2016 season of the FFAS Senior League Division 1 was the thirty-sixth season of association football competition in American Samoa.
The league was contested by 10 teams.

Clubs
These are the teams for the 2016 season.
Black Roses
Green Bay
Ilaoa and To'omata
Lion Heart
Pago Youth 
PanSa East
Royal Puma
Tafuna Jets
Utulei Youth
Vaiala Tongan

League table

Championship League table

References

External links 
 Standings at FIFA.com

FFAS Senior League seasons
American Samoa
football